The Godolphin and Latymer School is a private day school for girls in Hammersmith, West London.

The school motto is an ancient Cornish phrase, Francha Leale Toge, which translates as "free and loyal art thou". The school crest includes a double-headed white eagle, Godolphin in Cornish signifies a white eagle.

The Good Schools Guide called the school a "Very strong academic school with a friendly atmosphere, an outstanding head and a broad range of extra-curricular activities."

History
A private Act of Parliament in 1697 modified the wills of Sir William Godolphin (1634–96) in favour of his nephew Francis and niece Elizabeth and devoting £1,520 to charity. In 1703 this fund was used to purchase land west of St James's, Piccadilly, for education and other charitable purposes and, independently, in 1707 Elizabeth founded the Godolphin School, Salisbury, from her own resources. In 1856 the Godolphin School for boys was opened in Great Church Lane, Hammersmith. In 1862 The school relocated to the current Iffley Road site. Though initially successful, it closed in 1900. In 1905 it reopened as an independent day school for girls, associated with the Latymer Foundation and taking the name of the Godolphin and Latymer School.
 
From 1906 onwards it received grants from the London County Council and the Local Education Authority for equipment, library books and buildings. In 1939 the whole school was evacuated from London with no forward planning for where the school would stay. In 1951 the school became a state Voluntary aided school under the Education Act 1944, and ceased to charge fees to pupils. After the abolition of the scheme, the school chose to revert to full independent status in 1977 rather than join the state system and turn comprehensive and resumed the charging of fees to pupils.

The Godolphin and Latymer School celebrated its centenary in May 2005 with a service at St Paul's Cathedral. In the same year the nearby church of St John the Evangelist, designed by William Butterfield and built in the late 1850s, was closed and acquired by the School on a 125-year lease. It has been converted into the Bishop Arts Centre, named after Dame Joyce Bishop, who was headmistress between 1935 and 1963.

Houses

The house system has six houses:

Bassi – Laura Bassi – the first woman to earn a professorship in physics at a university, Bologna, 1732.
Lovelace – Ada Lovelace – an English mathematician and the first to publish a computer program in 1843.
Maathai – Wangari Maathai – an internationally renowned Kenyan environmental political activist and Nobel laureate.
Naidu – Sarojini Naidu – an Indian independence activist and poet.
Quinn-Brown – Hallie Quinn Brown – an African-American educator, writer and activist.
Sheppard – Kate Sheppard – the most prominent member of the women's suffrage movement in New Zealand.

Notable alumnae

The poet and Nobel Laureate W. B. Yeats was a pupil on the current Iffley Road site, attending the Godolphin School between 1877 and 1881.

Notable former pupils of the girls' school, known as Old Dolphins, include:
 Sarah Alexander, actress
 Kate Beckinsale, actress and model.
 Hattie Jacques, actress
Carrie Johnson, Communications and PR advisor and wife of former Prime Minister Boris Johnson
 Julia King, Baroness Brown of Cambridge
 Nigella Lawson, food writer, journalist and broadcaster
 Davina McCall, actress and television presenter
 Candida Moss, writer and academic
 Lucy Punch, English actress
 Jemma Redgrave, actor
 Annunziata Rees-Mogg, journalist and politician
 Hayaatun Sillem, CEO of the Royal Academy of Engineering
 Francesca Stavrakopoulou, writer and academic
 Winifred Watkins, biochemist
 Catherine Webb, author
 Zoe Williams, newspaper columnist

See also
 Sir William Godolphin
 Edward Latymer
 Gelehrtenschule des Johanneums (twinned school)
 Latymer Upper School
 Godolphin School, Salisbury

References

External links

Godolphin and Latymer School website
Profile at the Independent Schools Council website
Profile at the Good Schools Guide

Educational institutions established in 1861
Private girls' schools in London
 
Educational charities based in the United Kingdom
Private schools in the London Borough of Hammersmith and Fulham
Member schools of the Girls' Schools Association
International Baccalaureate schools in England
1861 establishments in England